Aker Arctic Technology Oy (often shortened to Aker Arctic) is a Finnish engineering company that operates an ice model test basin in Helsinki. In addition to ship model testing, the company offers various design, engineering and consulting services related to icebreakers, other icegoing vessels and arctic offshore projects as well as full scale trials, field expeditions and training for icy conditions. Formerly the arctic research centre of Wärtsilä and later Masa-Yards, Aker Arctic was established on 30 December 2004 as an independent company with Finnish Industry Investment Ltd,  ABB and Aker Solutions as its current shareholders.

Aker Arctic and its predecessors have designed more than half of the world's icebreakers. In addition, the company is responsible for a number of recent inventions in the design of icegoing ships, such as the double acting ship and oblique icebreaker concepts.

History 

The history of ice model testing in Finland began when Wärtsilä Icebreaking Model Basin (WIMB) was opened in a converted air raid shelter in Helsinki in 1969. The second ice test basin in the world, preceded by and modeled after the 1955-built Arctic and Antarctic Research Institute in Leningrad, Soviet Union, was a result of co-operation between Wärtsilä and Esso International, initially created for developing the hull form of the icebreaking oil tanker SS Manhattan. Later Wärtsilä, already an experienced and widely recognized builder of icebreaking ships, utilized the  test basin for its own projects at a time when Helsinki New Shipyard was continuously building new icebreakers. In the early 1980s, a decision was made to construct a new model test facility above ground.

Wärtsilä Arctic Research Centre (WARC), inaugurated in February 1983, was intended to become the leading ice model test facility in the world. In the mid-1980s, WARC also took over the responsibilities of Wärtsilä Arctic Design and Marketing (WADAM), a separate department which offered design and consultancy services to outside clients. In addition to inhouse R&D and commercial projects, the work carried out by WARC included basic research conducted by post-graduate students and research for the Finnish government. The work setup continued until the bankruptcy of Wärtsilä Marine in 1989.

When Masa-Yards took over the shipbuilding business of Wärtsilä in 1989, WARC became known as Masa-Yards Arctic Research Centre (MARC). Although initially scientific projects gained high priority, from 1990 on the work was primarily commercial. When Kværner, the owner of Masa-Yards since 1991, merged with its rival company Aker ASA and withdrew from the shipbuilding business in the early 2000s, it was decided to establish a new company to separate the arctic research department from the turbulent shipbuilding business. In addition, as the land lease agreement was reaching its end, a decision was made to construct a new model test facility elsewhere.

Aker Arctic Technology Oy was established on 30 December 2004 with Kværner Masa-Yards (later STX Finland) as its major shareholder and ABB, Aker Kværner (today Aker Solutions) and Wärtsilä as minor shareholders. Wärtsilä later withdrew from the joint company and sold its shares to the other shareholders. The construction of the new model test facility with a  model basin began in Vuosaari, near the old shipyard, in 2005 and Aker Arctic moved to its current premises in February 2006. 

On 17 December 2013, the state-owned holding company Finnish Industry Investment Ltd. purchased 66.4% of Aker Arctic's shares from STX Finland which previously owned 71.4% of the company. The remainder was divided equally between the minor shareholders, ABB and Aker Solutions, who both increased their share from 14.3% to 16.8%. According to the Minister of Economic Affairs Jan Vapaavuori, the company was acquired in order to prevent it from being sold to a foreign owner and as part of a funding arrangement for STX Finland.

On 1 June 2015, Aker Arctic acquired full ownership of AKAC Inc. The Canada-based company was established in 1984 by Arno Keinonen, who had previously worked as the director of the Wärtsilä Icebreaking Model Basin.

References

External links 
 

Engineering companies of Finland
Shipbuilding companies of Finland
Companies based in Helsinki